João Paulo Santos da Costa (born 2 February 1996), sometimes known as Andorinha, is a Portuguese professional footballer who plays as a goalkeeper.

Club career
Born in Barcelos, Braga District, Costa joined FC Porto's youth system at the age of 10. On 3 October 2015, he made his debut as a senior with the reserves, in a 2–0 away win against S.C. Olhanense for the LigaPro. He added a further six appearances during the season, as they achieved the feat of being the first B team to win the championship.

On 11 September 2016, in the 94th minute of the league fixture against F.C. Penafiel, Costa scored to help the hosts earn one point after the 2–2 draw. On 29 November, he remained on the bench for the first team during a 0–0 home draw to C.F. Belenenses in the group stage of the Taça da Liga.

Costa went on to serve two loans subsequently, his first being with Gil Vicente F.C. still in the second tier. Afterwards, he joined Spanish Segunda División B club FC Cartagena.

On 14 August 2019, Costa signed a permanent one-year deal with CD Mirandés, newly promoted to Segunda División. He played two extra-time away wins in the Copa del Rey, and his sole league appearance was a 4–0 loss at Racing de Santander on 17 September. Following the arrival of Raúl Lizoain, he left on 27 January 2020 and moved to Club Recreativo Granada on an 18-month deal.

Initially a part of the first team for the 2021 pre-season, Costa spent the 2021–22 campaign unregistered by both the main and reserve squads as he was already 25.

Career statistics

Club

Honours
Porto B
Segunda Liga: 2015–16

References

External links

Portuguese League profile 

1996 births
Living people
People from Barcelos, Portugal
Portuguese footballers
Association football goalkeepers
Liga Portugal 2 players
FC Porto B players
FC Porto players
Gil Vicente F.C. players
Segunda División players
Segunda División B players
FC Cartagena footballers
CD Mirandés footballers
Club Recreativo Granada players
Granada CF footballers
Portugal youth international footballers
Portuguese expatriate footballers
Expatriate footballers in Spain
Portuguese expatriate sportspeople in Spain
Sportspeople from Braga District